Earl Annesley, of Castlewellan in the County of Down, is a title in the Peerage of Ireland. It was created on 17 August 1789 for Francis Annesley, 2nd Viscount Glerawly, with special remainder to his younger brother the Honourable Richard Annesley. He had previously represented Downpatrick in the Irish House of Commons. The titles of Baron Annesley, of Castlewellan in the County of Down, and Viscount Glerawly, in the County of Fermanagh, were created in the Peerage of Ireland on 20 September 1758 and 14 November 1766 respectively for his father William Annesley, who sat as Member of the Irish Parliament for Midleton. Annesley was the sixth son of the Honourable Francis Annesley, fourth son of Francis Annesley, 1st Viscount Valentia.

The first Earl Annesley had several illegitimate children but no legitimate issue. He was succeeded (in the earldom according to the special remainder) by his younger brother, the second Earl. He had earlier represented seven different constituencies in the Irish Parliament and served as a Commissioner of Customs for Ireland. His eldest son, the third Earl, sat in the British House of Commons as the representative for Downpatrick. On his death the titles passed to his eldest son, the fourth Earl. He sat as Conservative Member of Parliament for Great Grimsby and was an Irish Representative Peer in the House of Lords from 1857 to 1874.

He never married and was succeeded by his younger brother, the fifth Earl. He was a soldier and also represented County Cavan in Parliament as a Conservative. Between 1877 and 1908 he sat in the House of Lords as an Irish Representative Peer. His line of the family failed on the death of his only son, the sixth Earl, who was killed during the First World War. During his life in 1884 the Earl had a property named the 'Moorish tower' constructed, only for it to become ruin before a century later. The late Earl was succeeded by his first cousin, the seventh Earl. He was the son of the Hon. William Octavius Beresford Annesley, sixth son of the third Earl. This line of the family failed in 1957 on the death of his son, the eighth Earl. He was succeeded by his third cousin once removed, the ninth Earl. He was the great-great-grandson of the Hon. Robert Annesley, second son of the second Earl.   the titles are held by the ninth Earl's third son, the twelfth Earl, who succeeded his elder brother in 2011.

Viscounts Glerawly (1766)
William Annesley, 1st Viscount Glerawly ( 1710–1770)
Francis Charles Annesley, 2nd Viscount Glerawly (1740–1802) (created Earl Annesley in 1789)

Earls Annesley (1789)
Francis Charles Annesley, 1st Earl Annesley (1740–1802)
Richard Annesley, 2nd Earl Annesley (1745–1824)
William Richard Annesley, 3rd Earl Annesley (1772–1838)
William Richard Annesley, 4th Earl Annesley (1830–1874)
Hugh Annesley, 5th Earl Annesley (1831–1908)
Francis Annesley, 6th Earl Annesley (1884–1914)
Walter Beresford Annesley, 7th Earl Annesley (1861–1934)
Beresford Cecil Bingham Annesley, 8th Earl Annesley (1894–1957)
Robert Annesley, 9th Earl Annesley (1900–1979)
Patrick Annesley, 10th Earl Annesley (1924–2001)
Philip Harrison Annesley, 11th Earl Annesley (1927–2011)
Michael Robert Annesley, 12th Earl Annesley (born 1933)

Present peer
Michael Robert Annesley, 12th Earl Annesley (born 4 December 1933) is the third son of the 9th Earl and his wife Nora Harrison. He was educated at Strode's Grammar School, Egham, Surrey. In 1949 he joined the Royal Air Force as an airman and in 1968 was a warrant officer. On 23 June 1956 he married Audrey Mary Goodwright, daughter of Ernest Stanley Goodwright. In 1997 he became a Fellow of the International Association of Book-Keepers. In 1999 his address was 16 Coltash Road, Furnace Green, Crawley, West Sussex.  On 11 March 2011 he succeeded his brother as Earl Annesley, Viscount Glerawly, and Baron Annesley, all in the peerage of Ireland. He has three children:
Michael Stephen Annesley, Viscount Glerawly (born 1957), heir apparent
Lady Sheila Marie Annesley (born 1961) 
Robert Francis Annesley (born 1962)

 Richard Annesley, 2nd Earl Annesley (1745–1824)
Hon. Robert Annesley (1773–1825)
James Annesley (1799–1859)
Arthur Adolphus Annesley (1833–1887)
Arthur Albert O'Donel Valentia Annesley (1867–1947)
 Robert Annesley, 9th Earl Annesley (1900–1979)
 Michael Annesley, 12th Earl Annesley (b. 1933)
(1). Michael Stephen Annesley, Viscount Glerawly (b. 1957)
(2).  Michael David Annesley (b. 1984)
(3). Kenzie Michael Annesley (b. 2014)
Hon. Arthur Grove Annesley (1774–1849)
Richard Grove Annesley (1815–1892)
Richard Arthur Grove Annesley (1879–1966)
Richard Francis Michael Grove Annesley (1908–1979)
(4). Richard David Fergus Robert Annesley (b. 1940)
(5). Michael Richard Edward Grove Annesley  (b. 1970)
(6). Robert Patrick Sean Grove Annesley (b. 1971)
Francis Charles Annesley (1775–1832)
William Henry Annesley (1830–1875)
William Robert Ewart Annesley (1872–1914)
William Alan Cecil Annesley (1907–1976)
desc.

See also
Viscount Valentia

References

External links

Kidd, Charles, Williamson, David (editors). Debrett's Peerage and Baronetage (1990 edition). New York: St Martin's Press, 1990
Reference, ''London Gazette; accessed 12 July 2014.

Earldoms in the Peerage of Ireland
County Down
People from Crawley
Noble titles created in 1789
Earl
 
Peerages created with special remainders